Bee Movie Game is a video game based on the DreamWorks-animated movie Bee Movie. The game was released on October 30, 2007. Beenox developed the Xbox 360, PlayStation 2, and Microsoft Windows versions of the game, Smart Bomb Interactive developed the Wii version, and Vicarious Visions developed the Nintendo DS version. As Barry B. Benson, players take on an adventure to save the bees' production of honey through New York City. Players get to experience Barry's life within the hive and navigate their way around the world from the feature film using many techniques. Players can drive through the city using race cars, scooters, taxicabs, and trucks. Players can "fly" Barry at high speed through the sky. Using the Pollinator, players can Blast through obstacles or they can Buzz to cause a chain reaction. Players get to Stop Time by using Barry's bee reflexes. The video game features 2-person multiplayer mini games. Jerry Seinfeld, John Goodman, Patrick Warburton, and Tress MacNeille reprise their voices from the movie in this game.

Synopsis
A honey bee named Barry B. Benson stars on a new show known as "New Hive Tonight". On the show, Barry talks about how he changed the lives of honey bees and humans, bringing them together.

On his graduation day from BU University (which is the only university in the entire hive, and also maybe a spoof of Boston University, having the same abbreviation), Barry and his best friend Adam Flayman head to a honey factory called "Honex", where they are to work for the rest of their lives. Adam enjoys working, but Barry does not, thinking that everything they do in Honex is making honey, and longs to do something else in the remaining stage of his life. The game focuses on Barry's various job skills which are not in the movie such as car racing, Taxi, playing video arcade games, delivering food to owners, car fixing and doing Honex jobs while not in a mission.

Barry decides that he wants to go to the outside and joins the Pollen Jocks, a group of bees who go to the "outside" to collect nectar from flowers and bring them back. A Pollen Jock manages to train Barry so he would be a Pollen Jock such as how to make flowers bloom, and getting Nectar from them. He also teaches him to kill other non-bee insects such as hornets, wasps, and dragonflies. However, while Barry is resting, it starts to rain, but he manages to find cover in the apartment of a couple: Vanessa and Ken. After distracting a few party guests in the apartment, Ken tries to smash Barry, but Vanessa allows him to escape. Barry soon discovers that the humans "steal" their honey regularly, so he goes to get the honey back. Upon arriving at the grocery store, he duels the owner, Hector, in order to tell him the whereabouts where the honey came from. After chasing a truck delivering honey, he finds himself in a honey farm, where he takes pictures of it to prove to the rest of the bees that the humans are "stealing" their honey. However, a squad of wasps arrive at the apiary to take away the bees and kill Barry but he manages to fend them off and rout them, foiling their plans. Then, Freddy the head Beekeeper manages to smoke all the bees but Barry and the other bees defeat the Beekeeper which he bumps his head on the tree.

Barry and Adam chase after the car of a main defense lawyer named Layton T Montgomery, and secretly listen to a conversation between him and his associate about the human-stealing-honey case while they are in a restaurant called La Couchon. He sneaks into Montgomery's house along with Vanessa and Barry disguises himself as a fly in a Tron-like suit to gain access to a safe which holds papers explaining Montgomery's plan, but it is revealed to be a trick and he is attacked by a group of hornets, but he manages to defeat them.

Barry later goes back to the grocery store as he takes pictures to get evidence on different honey-flavored products. However, Hector notices this, and has Montgomery send his agents to kill Barry. When this fails, Hector captures Adam by trapping him in glass, prompting Barry to rescue him. After rescuing Adam, Hector decides to have the store's sprinklers rain down to finish them off, but Barry escapes using bee reflexes.

Critical reception

The game received "mixed or average reviews" on all platforms according to the review aggregation website Metacritic.

GameZone said that the PC version "will certainly have some charm for younger players, but there are a few challenges to overcome while playing it. Even a 13-year old was surprised and confused when the game changed control options, moving from WASD and arrow keys to numbers, during one section."

See also
 List of Games for Windows titles

References

External links
  archived on October 28, 2007
 
 

2007 video games
3D platform games
Nintendo DS games
Xbox 360 games
Wii games
PlayStation 2 games
Games for Windows certified games
Activision games
Video games about insects
Video games developed in Canada
Video games scored by Rupert Gregson-Williams
Video games scored by James Dooley (composer)
Video games scored by Dan Morris
Video games based on films
Video games set in New York City
Beenox games
Video game memes
Open-world video games
Video games developed in the United States
Multiplayer and single-player video games
Vicarious Visions games